Mohamed Touré may refer to:

 Mohamed Touré (footballer, born 1997), Ivorian football winger for Canelas
 Mohamed Toure (footballer, born 2004), Liberian-Australian football winger for Adelaide United